The 2015 U.S. Open Grand Prix was the twenty-first grand prix gold and grand prix tournament of the 2015 BWF Grand Prix Gold and Grand Prix. The tournament was held in Orange County Badminton Club, Orange, United States, from December 7 until December 12, 2015 and had a total purse of $50,000.

Men's singles

Seeds

  Lee Hyun-il (champion)
  Rajiv Ouseph (final)
  Sho Sasaki (first round)
  Hsu Jen-hao (semifinals)
  Tanongsak Saensomboonsuk (second round)
  Lee Dong-keun (third round)
  Boonsak Ponsana (semifinals)
  Pablo Abian (quarterfinals)
  Zulfadli Zulkiffli (second round)
  Nguyen Tien Minh (first round)
  Kenichi Tago (withdrawn)
  Misha Zilberman (third round)
  Kevin Cordon (third round)
  Luka Wraber (second round)
  David Obernosterer (third round)
  Osleni Guerrero (withdrawn)

Finals

Top half

Section 1

Section 2

Section 3

Section 4

Bottom half

Section 5

Section 6

Section 7

Section 8

Women's singles

Seeds

  Nozomi Okuhara (withdrawn)
  Bae Yeon-ju (second round)
  Michelle Li (second round)
  Busanan Ongbumrungpan (second round)
  Minatsu Mitani (semifinals)
  Yui Hashimoto (withdrawn)
  Kirsty Gilmour (final)
  Porntip Buranaprasertsuk (quarterfinals)

Finals

Top half

Section 1

Section 2

Bottom half

Section 3

Section 4

Men's doubles

Seeds

  Vladimir Ivanov / Ivan Sozonov (final)
  Goh V Shem / Tan Wee Kiong (champion)
  Manu Attri / B. Sumeeth Reddy (second round)
  Chen Hung-ling / Wang Chi-lin (semifinals)
  Marcus Ellis / Chris Langridge (quarterfinals)
  Michael Fuchs / Johannes Schoettler (quarterfinals)
  Dechapol Puavaranukroh / Kittinupong Kedren (quarterfinals)
  Andrew Ellis / Peter Mills (withdrawn)

Finals

Top half

Section 1

Section 2

Bottom half

Section 3

Section 4

Women's doubles

Seeds

  Reika Kakiiwa / Miyuki Maeda (withdrawn)
  Naoko Fukuman / Kurumi Yonao (withdrawn)
  Go Ah-ra / Yoo Hae-won (withdrawn)
  Jongkongphan Kittiharakul / Rawinda Prajongjai (quarterfinals)

Finals

Top half

Section 1

Section 2

Bottom half

Section 3

Section 4

Mixed doubles

Seeds

  Michael Fuchs / Birgit Michels (final)
  Chan Peng Soon / Goh Liu Ying (quarterfinals)
  Danny Bawa Chrisnanta / Vanessa Neo Yu Yan (first round)
  Sudket Prapakamol / Saralee Thoungthongkam (first round)
  Phillip Chew / Jamie Subandhi (semifinals)
  Ronan Labar / Emilie Lefel (quarterfinals)
  Toby Ng / Alex Bruce (first round)
  Choi Sol-gyu / Eom Hye-won (champion)

Finals

Top half

Section 1

Section 2

Bottom half

Section 3

Section 4

References
tournamentsoftware.com

U.S. Open Grand Prix
BWF Grand Prix Gold and Grand Prix